The 2009 Genesis was a professional wrestling pay-per-view (PPV) event produced by Total Nonstop Action Wrestling (TNA), which took place on January 11, 2009 at the Bojangles' Coliseum in Charlotte, North Carolina. It was originally scheduled to take place on November 9, 2008 at the Impact! Zone in Orlando, Florida, however, TNA moved Turning Point to that date instead. It was the fourth event under the Genesis chronology.

In October 2017, with the launch of the Global Wrestling Network, the event became available to stream on demand. It would later be available on Impact Plus in May 2019.

Storylines

Genesis featured eight professional wrestling matches that involved different wrestlers from pre-existing scripted feuds and storylines. Wrestlers portrayed villains, heroes, or less distinguishable characters in the scripted events that built tension and culminated in a wrestling match or series of matches.

Results

X Division Championship Tournament bracket

Six-Man Elimination Tag Team Match

References

External links
Genesis at In Demand.com

Impact Wrestling Genesis
2009 in North Carolina
Events in Charlotte, North Carolina
Professional wrestling in Charlotte, North Carolina
January 2009 events in the United States
2009 Total Nonstop Action Wrestling pay-per-view events

pl:TNA Genesis